Time to Share is the thirteenth album from Japanese musician Toshinobu Kubota, released on September 21, 2004 under his alias "Toshi."  It was Kubota's third English album.

Background and recording 

Time so Share was recorded at a multitude of locations, including the New York studios like Battery Studios, Glowy Studios, Jammin' Downtown Studios, Quad Recording Studios, and Stash House Studios. It was also recorded at Westlake Studios in Los Angeles, and Home Cookin in Philadelphia. Toshi co-wrote all the songs on the album, which has collaborations with rapper Mos Def and singer Angie Stone. Although uncredited as a featured vocalist, Stone sings background vocals on the songs "Beating My Heart," "Breaking Through," "It's Time," and "Shadows of Your Love." Sy Smith appears on the song "Neva Satisfied," and Felicia "Fenix" Graham appears on the song "Hope You'll Be Well."

Release and charts 

By September 11 in 2004, the first single "Breaking Through" had been released to R&B radio, and Epic had placed it on BET and MTV2. The album was released by SMI Records Inc on September 21, 2004 under his alias "Toshi." Epic/Sony Urban Music also released the album on September 21, 2004.

The album charted at number 25 on the Oricon Albums chart. The album featured the singles "Breaking Through" and "Shadows of Your Love." In the same year, Kubota appeared on the American television show Soul Train to promote the album, becoming the first Japanese singer to appear on the show. After the release of the album, Kubota toured with Angie Stone in 2005.

Reception 

Billboard called it "blissfully groove-drenched." Allmusic reviewed the album, and wrote that it "is another fine album [like Toshi's last], but... the material is too mature and laid-back to appeal to more than attentive contemporary R&B fans in their late twenties and thirties. And that's not a knock on the artist."

Track listing
 "Beating of My Heart"
 "Living for Today" (feat. Mos Def)
 "Breaking Through/Yaheat/Mybeat (Interlude, Pt. 1)"
 "Hold Me Down" (feat. Angie Stone)
 "Neva Satisfied"
 "Shadows of Your Love"
 "It's Time"
 "'Cause You're So Bad"
 "Hope You'll Be Well/Yaheat/Mybeat (Interlude, Pt. 2)"
 "Voodoo Woman" (feat. Renee Neufville)

Personnel 

These are the credits:
 Gary Beech - 	Product Manager
 Mike Campbell - 	Guitar
 Matt Cappy - 	Trumpet
 Susanne Cerha - 	Art Direction, Design
 Lysa Cooper - 	Stylist
 Amil Dave - 	Production Coordination
 Tenita Dreher - 	Vocals (Background)
 Ken "Supa Engineer" Duro - 	Mixing
 Keith Fluitt - 	Vocals (Background)
 Larry Gold - 	String Arrangements
 Felicia Graham - 	Vocals (Background)
 Carvin "Ransum" Haggins - 	Engineer, Producer, Vocal Producer
 Carlos "DJ Smooth" Henderson - 	Composer and Bass
 Naoto Ikeda - 	Photography
 John James - 	Vocals (Background)
 Yusuke Katsuki - 	Grooming
 Yutaka Kawana - 	Assistant Engineer, Guitar
 Toshi Kubota - 	Drum Programming, Guitar, Keyboard Programming, Primary Artist, Producer, Programming, Vocal Arrangement, Vocal Producer, Vocals (Background)
 Jessica Kyle - 	Vocals (Background)
 Selan Lerner - 	Fender Rhodes, Keyboards, Soloist
 Magdaleno Martinez - 	Composer
 Mos Def (Dante Smith) - Composer, Guest Artist, Primary Artist
 Ali Shaheed Muhammad - 	Instrumentation, Producer, Programming
 Renee Neufville - 	Primary Artist, Vocals (Background)
 Jonathan D. Richmond - 	Instrumentation, Producer, Programming, Vocals (Background)
 Ralph Rolle - 	Drum Programming, Drums, Keyboard Programming, Poetry Reading, Producer, Vocal Director, Vocals (Background), Voices
 Francesco Romano - 	Guitar
 Amanda Rosamilia - 	A&R Assistance
 Sy Smith - 	Vocal Arrangement, Vocals (Background)
 Angie Stone - 	Guest Artist, Primary Artist, Producer, Vocals (Background)
 Diamond Stone - 	Vocals (Background)
 Third Eye - 	MC
 Thaddeus T. Tribbett - 	Bass
 Elisabeth Withers - 	Vocals (Background)
 Parris Bowens - 	Keyboards

Engineers 
 Charles "Prince Charles" Alexander - 	Mixing
 Tim Donovan - 	Engineer, Mixing
 Serban Ghenea - 	Mixing
 Andre Netto - 	Assistant Engineer
 Tim Olmstead - 	Assistant Engineer
 Herb Powers - 	Mastering
 Jason Rankins - 	Assistant Engineer
 Alejandro Rodriguez - 	Assistant Engineer
 Andros Rodriguez - Assistant Engineer
 Rich Tapper - 	Assistant Engineer
 Miki Tsutsumi - 	Assistant Engineer
 Ray Wilson - 	Engineer

Producers 
 Buck Wild - 	Producer
 Lisa Ellis - 	Executive Producer
 Kaz Hayashida - 	Executive Producer
 Toshi Rolle - 	Producer
 L. Londell McMillan - 	Executive Producer
 Ivan "Orthodox" Barias - 	Engineer, Instrumentation, Producer
 X Firm - 	Producer

References

2004 albums
Toshinobu Kubota albums
Sony Music albums